Wunschpunsch is a children's animated fantasy television series, co-produced by Saban International Paris, CinéGroupe and TF1, with the participation of Ventura Film Distributors B.V. and ARD/Degeto, and with the collaboration from Radio-Canada. The series is inspired by the 1989 German novel The Night of Wishes by Michael Ende. The show aired in the United States on Cartoon Network, in France on TF1, in Netherlands on Disney Channel, in Europe and MENA on Fox Kids (later Jetix) and Jetix Play, in Australia and New Zealand on Nickelodeon and in Germany on ARD and KiKa.

Plot
In every episode, an eccentric old wizard named Bubonic and his aunt, a witch named Tyrannia, must wreak havoc on the city in which they live or suffer a severe punishment from their supervisor, Maledictus T. Maggot. To be able to do so, they use an ancient magical parchment that, once utilized to activate a spell, said spell must be reversed within the next seven hours; otherwise, its effects will become permanent and irreversible. To make sure the spells are reversed, Bubonic's and Tyrannia's pets, Mauricio di Mauro and Jacob Scribble, must seek out Aunt Noah, an old turtle at the local zoo and head of the Animal Council, for a riddle on how to reverse the spell, which they usually manage to do in the nick of time. One of the episodes, Night of Wishes, is particularly inspired by the book. In that episode, the animals foil the spell by dropping a bell sound into the potion cauldron and Maledictus Maggot punishes Bubonic and Tyrannia for the foiled spell by attaching their homes, forcing them to live together. Unlike the other known punishments that never last enough to be seen in later episodes, this one seems to be permanent and has lasted at least five years (the animals recall that it has been five years since it happened). Bubonic and Tyrannia are so clumsy that some of their spells bring trouble to themselves, and when the spells are undone, they feel a temporary relief that quickly ends when Maggot shows up to punish them for their failure.

Characters
 Mauricio di Mauro: A chubby cat with a large appetite. He likes to brag about his lineage, which goes back to medieval/Venetian times. He is Bubonic's pet. He is eager and happy-go-lucky, but he's much smarter than he seems. He carries around with him a small red pocket watch, which he uses to keep track of how long he and Jacob have left until each spell is permanent. He is voiced by Rick Jones.
 Jacob Scribble: Tyrannia's pet, a stocky old raven frequently complaining about his rheumatism. He can be uptight, sarcastic, arrogant and proud, but he's good at heart and he genuinely loves and cares for Mauricio. Although he has a main love interest named Ravenia, he is a womaniser despite his plain appearance and, like his book counterpart, has multiple wives. He is talented at many things, such as cello playing, skiing and ice skating. He is voiced by Harry Hill.
 Bubonic Preposteror: An old cranky wizard. He likes to keep things traditional, refraining himself from using modern technology. He fits into the stereotypical view of an old medieval wizard living in a derelict tower. His hobbies include playing his cello and gardening, but as expected from an evil wizard, his garden is full of dangerous flesh eating plants and his cello playing is horrible. He is voiced by Rick Jones.
 Tyrannia Vampirella: Bubonic's aunt. Despite being older than her nephew, Tyrannia embraces modern technology and fashion, to the point of calling Bubonic an old fashioned relic. Much to Bubonic's annoyance, she also likes loud music. She wears a different outfit (and sometimes hairstyle/color) in every episode. She is voiced by Kathleen Fee.
 Maledictus T. Maggot: The supervisor of the two wizards, a very powerful wizard himself and the main antagonist of the series. Maggot looks like a combination between a humanoid bug and amphibian. At the start of almost every episode he appears before the wizards and reminds them they need to cast an evil curse on the city or the consequences will be nasty. Naturally, due to the interference of two protagonists (Mauricio and Jacob), their curse fails, causing Maggot to punish the wizards, usually turning them into something related to the curse of the episode. Despite the fact that he's evil and grumpy, he is happily married. He is voiced by Vlasta Vrána.
 Auntie Noah: A wise old tortoise living in the Megalopolis Zoo. She assists Mauricio and Jacob by giving advice on how to break the curse, always in the form of a riddle. She has some magical abilities of her own, such as in "Life With Maggot" when she visit Mauricio and Jacob in a dream. Although she is not from the original novel, she is inspired by other turtles and tortoises from Ende's works such as Morla from The Neverending Story and Cassiopeia from Momo. She is voiced by Joanna Noyes.
 The Cozy family: The neighbors of the wizards. Mauricio is on good terms with their son Kip. They are also seen in most episodes to show the effects of the wizards' newest curse.
 Mayor Plaga: The overweight mayor of Megalopolis, a typical self-centered politician. He isn't very competent but he cares about his city.
 Chief Hydrant: The local firefighter who has a bitter rivalry with the Mayor.
 Barbara Blabber: The local news reporter who is full of herself. Bubonic is attracted to her.
 The animal council: A lioness, goat, pig and monkey who are Auntie Noah's subordinates.
 Meathead: Bubonic's pet carnivorous plant.
 Oak Foot: Chief Hydrant's pet dog. He sometimes helps Mauricio and Jacob on their missions.
 Mrs. Maggot: Maggot's wife. She loves and cares for her husband, and although she's not evil like him, she gently bosses him around. In the final episode she temporarily replaced him as Tyrannia and Bubonic's supervisor due to him getting sick.

Episodes

Series overview

Season 1 (2000)

Season 2 (2001)

Development and broadcast
The show was first confirmed to be in development in August 1996 under the book's title of Night of the Wishes, when Saban Entertainment and the German ARD network agreed to a three-year, $50 million co-production and library program licensing agreement. The other show to be produced in the agreement was Jim Button.

In February 2000, the series began development under the name Wunschpunsch, being produced by the French Saban International Paris and the Canadian CinéGroupe, and was pre-sold to Radio-Canada and TF1 in the same month. By October 2000, the show was confirmed to air on Fox Kids networks around Europe and the Middle East and later premiered in France near the end of the year.

The series premiered on Radio-Canada in French on September 8, 2001. Followed on with a German broadcast on KiKA on November 9, 2001, airing every weekday, and on ARD November 18, 2001, where a new episode aired every Sunday.

Reruns of the series aired in Netherlands in 2011-2012 on Disney Channel, and between July 2016 and February 2017 on Unis, in Canada.

References

External links
 

2000 French television series debuts
2001 French television series endings
2000s French animated television series
2000 Canadian television series debuts
2001 Canadian television series endings
2000s Canadian animated television series
Canadian children's animated comedy television series
Canadian children's animated fantasy television series
French children's animated comedy television series
French children's animated fantasy television series
French-language television shows
Fox Kids
Animated television series about birds
Animated television series about cats
Television series by Saban Entertainment
Television shows based on German novels